1985 World Rhythmic Gymnastics Championships were held in Valladolid, Spain on October 10–13, 1985.

Participants
The following countries sent competitor(s) Australia, Austria, Belgium, Brazil, Bulgaria, Canada, China, Cuba, Czechoslovakia, Denmark, East Germany, Finland, France,  Greece, Hungary, Israel, Italy, Japan, The Netherlands, New Zealand, North Korea, Norway, Poland, Portugal, Romania, South Korea, Spain, Sweden, Switzerland, Turkey, The United Kingdom, USA, USSR, West Germany & Yugoslavia

Individual

Groups
Countries who participated in the group competition are as follows.

Medal table

Individual Final

Individual All-Around

Individual Rope

Individual Ball

Individual Clubs

Individual Ribbon

Group

Preliminaries

Finals

References
RSG.net

External links
FIG - International Governing Body for Rhythmic Gymnastics

Rhythmic Gymnastics World Championships
Rhythmic Gymnastics Championships
Gymnastics Championships
Rhythmic Gymnastics Championships